William de Hertford was the member of Parliament for Gloucester in the parliaments of the early 1300s.

See also
John de Hertford

References 

Year of birth missing
Year of death missing
Members of the Parliament of England (pre-1707) for Gloucester